Noyrukh is a rural locality (a selo) in Mazadinsky Selsoviet, Tlyaratinsky District, Republic of Dagestan, Russia. The population was 217 as of 2010.

Geography 
Noyrukh is located 21 km north of Tlyarata (the district's administrative centre) by road. Mazada ana Maalib are the nearest rural localities.

References 

Rural localities in Tlyaratinsky District